Geren is a surname. Notable people with the surname include:

Bob Geren (born 1961), American baseball player
Charlie Geren (born 1949), American politician
Pete Geren (born 1952), American politician
Preston Geren Jr. (1923–2013), American architect and father of Charlie and Pete Geren
Preston Geren Sr. (1891–1969), American architect and engineer and father of Preston Geren Jr.
Richard Geren (1917-2002), American geologist